The head of St. John the Baptist is a tondo painting by the Italian Renaissance master Giovanni Bellini. It is now housed in the Civic  Museum of  Pesaro. 

The painting depicts the head of the St. John the Baptist just after his decapitation, with blood still dripping from the neck. The perspective from below show the influence of the treatises about perspective representation of the human figure which were being published at the time, such as Piero della Francesca's De prospectiva pingendi.

Stylistically, the brilliant colors and the dramatic painting are similar to those of St. Vincent Ferrer Polyptych, the first mature work by Bellini, dated to after 1464.

Sources

Paintings by Giovanni Bellini
1460s paintings
Paintings depicting John the Baptist
Paintings in Pesaro